Roger Schjerva (born 19 January 1968) is a Norwegian politician for the Socialist Left Party.

Born in Oslo, he graduated as cand.oecon. from the University of Oslo in 2000. He started his political career as a secretary and advisor for his party.

When the second cabinet Stoltenberg assumed office following the 2005 election, he was appointed State Secretary in the Ministry of Finance.

References
Biography at Government.no 

1968 births
Living people
Socialist Left Party (Norway) politicians
Norwegian state secretaries
Politicians from Oslo
University of Oslo alumni